Antonio Álvarez Pérez (born 21 January 1975), known as Ito, is a Spanish retired footballer who played as a defensive midfielder, and a manager.

He amassed La Liga totals of 282 matches and seven goals over ten seasons, mainly with Betis (five years) and Espanyol (three).

Club career
Born in Almendralejo, Extremadura, Ito started playing professionally with local CF Extremadura, helping it rise from the third division to La Liga and making his top flight debut on 9 September 1996 in a game against Real Betis. Even though the club was finally relegated he was a key midfield element (39 matches, one goal) and attracted interest from RC Celta de Vigo, which he helped qualify for the UEFA Cup in his sole season.

Subsequently, Ito spent six years with Betis, being relegated in his second season but always being an important first-team member, on occasion wearing the captain's armband. Released in 2004, he joined Barcelona's RCD Espanyol.

With Espanyol, Ito won the 2006 edition of the Copa del Rey and, although a reserve in the Catalan team's 2006–07 league campaign – eight appearances – he played in ten UEFA Cup games as they lost the final on penalties, to Sevilla FC.

In July 2007, Ito signed with second level side Córdoba CF, being released at the age of 34 after two seasons of regular playing time, after which he dropped down a division and joined CP Cacereño in his native region.

International career
After a fine individual campaign with Celta which led to a transfer to Betis, Ito earned his sole cap for Spain on 23 September 1998, appearing in the last two minutes of a 1–0 friendly win over Russia in Granada.

Previously, he helped the under-21s win the 1998 UEFA European Championships, playing in the final against Greece.

Honours

Club
Espanyol
Copa del Rey: 2005–06
UEFA Cup: Runner-up 2006–07

International
Spain U21
UEFA European Under-21 Championship: 1998

References

External links
 
 
 

1975 births
Living people
People from Almendralejo
Spanish footballers
Footballers from Extremadura
Association football midfielders
La Liga players
Segunda División players
Segunda División B players
CF Extremadura footballers
RC Celta de Vigo players
Real Betis players
RCD Espanyol footballers
Córdoba CF players
CP Cacereño players
Spain youth international footballers
Spain under-21 international footballers
Spain international footballers
Spanish football managers